The AFL Draft Combine, formerly known as the AFL Draft Camp, is a gathering of prospective talent, where selected potential draftees display their athletic prowess and relevant Australian rules football skills. Over four days participants are required to undergo a series of medical, psychomotor, athletic and fitness tests as well as interviews conducted by the 18 clubs in the Australian Football League. The first AFL Draft Camp was held in 1994 at Waverley Park; in 1999 it moved to Canberra, where it was hosted by the Australian Institute of Sport, and in 2011 it was moved to Docklands Stadium. Each year the Draft Combine is held in the week following the AFL Grand Final.

Purpose 
The testing results measured at the combine are used to inform recruiters of players' athletic attributes and skills heading into the AFL Draft, which is held in November. Recruiters also have the opportunity to interview participants whom they may potentially want to draft. Clubs are able to send a representative to the combine, where they are able to conduct a medical screening on participants. This screening gives clubs an idea of a player's past injuries and future injury concerns.

Invitations 
To be eligible for the AFL Draft Combine, a player must receive at least 5 nominations from AFL clubs. Leading into the combine, AFL recruiting managers are expected to submit a list of 70 players from the draft pool whom they would like to screen at the national combine. Approximately 100 invitees attend the draft combine. Draft hopefuls who don't receive enough nominations for the national combine but still receive 3 or 4 nominations have the opportunity to attend their respective state screening.

Players who are overlooked for the national combine may be invited to attend a state-based combine, where similar testing is done.

Tests 
The following tests performed at the combine are associated with the attributes required to perform in the AFL.

Beep test (shuttle run) 
Players are to finish a 20-metre leg before the sound of the beep; they continue to run back and forth as the time in between each beep gets shorter. The test starts at level 1 and finishes at level 21. When a person fails to make the line before the beep, they no longer are allowed to continue. This test was replaced with the yo-yo test in 2017.

3km time trial 
In groups of 10–20, players are to complete a 3000-metre run as fast as they can. The finishing time is then recorded. This was replaced by the 2km time trial in 2017.

Repeat sprint test 
This test is designed to measure both speed and endurance. Here players complete six 30-metre sprints, with the cumulative time recorded.

Agility test 
The player starts standing upright; once they pass through the gates, the player is to navigate around a series of poles (without touching them or knocking them down) and reach the finishing gates as quickly as possible.

20-metre sprint 
This is to measure a player's speed. The individual being tested begins in a crouched position. They are then to sprint as fast as they can up to 20 metres. Sensors are used to measure the time taken to the 5m, 10m and 20m mark. Each player is given 3 attempts at this, with the quickest time being recorded.

Running vertical jump 
In this test an instrument called a vertec is used to measure a player jumping off one leg from a running start. The player being tested aims to hit the 'fingers' on the vertec as high up as possible.

Standing vertical jump 
This is similar to the running vertical jump, however, the player instead takes off on two feet from a stationary start. The aim again is to hit the fingers as high up as possible on the vertec.

Nathan Buckley kicking test 
This test was devised by Nathan Buckley and is used to measure a player's kicking efficiency over six kicks. Six targets are set out at distances of 20, 30 and 40 metres. An official is designated to request a target at random and call the instructions out to the kicker. The kicker then proceeds hit the target. Each kick is given a score from one to five (five being the perfect kick).

Matthew Lloyd clean hands test 
Matthew Lloyd designed this test to measure how well a player takes possession of a football and is able to dispose of it using a handball. Three targets are set up on both the left and right sides at distances of 6, 8 and 10 metres. The test starts with an official either rolling or throwing a football at the player; an instruction of what target to hit is then called out by the official. The player then attempts to handball the ball at the target. This is done six times and a score from one to five is allocated for each handball.

Brad Johnson goal-touching test 
This test was constructed by Brad Johnson and measures a player's accuracy kicking for goal. This test takes place on an oval with four markers placed at different angles and distances to kick from. Five kicks are taken in total: two set shots, two snaps (one left and one right) and one kick on the run. A score is then derived from the number of goals and behinds a player kicks.

Physical 
Measurements of a player's height, weight, skinfolds, arm length and hand span are all recorded.

Testing records 

The fastest agility test ever recorded at any AFL combine was 7.761 seconds by Tyrone Thorne at the 2019 Western Australia draft combine. 

 The highest standing vertical jump ever recorded at any AFL combine was 91.4 cm by American prospect Justin Wesley at the 2014 US International Combine in Los Angeles.

 Justin Wesley recorded a 2.81 at the 2014 US International Combine. Reef McInnes recorded a 2.779 in 2020; however, as the sprint was held outside in a tailwind, this time is not included in records.

AFL International Combine 
The AFL has increasingly looked to expand the game beyond Australia in recent years. It is estimated over 100,000 people participate in the sport outside Australia. The Australian Football International Cup takes place every three years in Melbourne, where teams from 18 countries compete against each other. The growth of the game and the prospective talent overseas has led to the AFL establishing combines internationally.

US Combine 
The US AFL Combine is currently held at IMG Academy in Florida. All 15 participants from the 2015 combine were from a college basketball background. Each year a minimum of two of the group will be chosen to partake in the AFL National Combine held in Melbourne. Eric Wallace, Mason Cox and Jason Holmes are all AFL listed players who are former US Combine graduates.

European Combine 

The European Combine is held in Dublin and overseen by AFL International Talent Manager Tadhg Kennelly, a former player for the Sydney Swans who was originally drafted from Ireland. Among those who try out, a large proportion are Gaelic footballers. The skill set of Gaelic football is considered similar to that of AFL. The two best-performing participants at the combine are then given the opportunity to attend the AFL National Combine. Sean Hurley, Paddy Brophy, Daniel Flynn, Ciarán Byrne, Ciarán Sheehan and Cian Hanley are some notable people who have previously attended the combine.

References 

Australian Football League draft
Australian Football League